Puzzle People is the eleventh studio album released by American soul quintet The Temptations for the Gordy (Motown) label in 1969. Produced entirely by Norman Whitfield, Puzzle People expanded on the psychedelic soul sound of the Temptations' previous LP, Cloud Nine. Although a few straightforward soul ballads are present, the album is primarily composed of Sly & the Family Stone/James Brown-derived proto-funk tracks such as the lead single "Don't Let the Joneses Get You Down", and the number-one Billboard Pop hit "I Can't Get Next to You".

Puzzle People was released simultaneously with Together, a duets album of covers by the Temptations and labelmates Diana Ross & the Supremes.  It peaked into the Top 5 on the Billboard Pop Albums chart, and spent fifteen weeks at number one on the R&B Albums chart.

Track listing

All selections produced by Norman Whitfield.

Personnel
The Temptations
 Dennis Edwards - vocals
 Eddie Kendricks - vocals
 Paul Williams - vocals
 Melvin Franklin - vocals
 Otis Williams - vocals
with:
 Norman Whitfield - producer, songwriter
 Barrett Strong - lyricist
 The Funk Brothers - instrumentation

Charts

See also
List of Billboard number-one R&B albums of the 1960s
List of number-one R&B albums of 1970 (U.S.)

References

1969 albums
The Temptations albums
Gordy Records albums
Albums produced by Norman Whitfield